The Arab Law Quarterly is an English language quarterly devoted to Arab law. The magazine was first published in September 1985. It is based in London and was published by Lloyd's of London in the past. It is now published by Brill Publishers.

References

External links

1985 establishments in the United Kingdom
Brill Publishers academic journals
English-language magazines
Law journals
Magazines established in 1985
Magazines published in London
Quarterly magazines published in the United Kingdom